Wander is a narrative-focused massively multiplayer online game developed by Loki Davison and an independent team in Australia.

Set in a peaceful fantasy setting populated by shapeshifters, Wander encourages players to reveal more of the story by cooperatively exploring new areas of the game world.

Upon release, Wander was criticized for being buggy and incomplete. It got a 4/10 from Push Square.

References

External links
 Official website
 Facebook page
 Twitter page

2015 video games
Fantasy video games
Indie video games
PlayStation 4 games
Steam Greenlight games
Video games developed in Australia
Windows games